Biotti is an Italian surname. Notable people with the surname include:

Carlo Biotti, Italian jurist
Chris Biotti, ice hockey player
Brent Biotti, submariner